Engin Ünal (born 30 September 1936) is a Turkish swimmer. He competed in the men's 200 metre breaststroke at the 1960 Summer Olympics.

References

1936 births
Living people
Turkish male breaststroke swimmers
Olympic swimmers of Turkey
Swimmers at the 1960 Summer Olympics
Sportspeople from Ankara